Tamim ibn Zayd al-Ansari was a Muslim saint (Walī) whose dargah (shrine) is located in Kovalam, Tamil Nadu, India which is 30 km from Chennai. Al-Ansari was born in the city of Medina, Saudi Arabia and is a Badr Sahabi (companion of the Islamic prophet Muhammad and participated in Badr war). He visited the Asian continent during the caliphate of Umar ibn al-Khattab and stayed in Sindh for 18 years.

Shrine

His shrine (dargah) is located in Kovalam, Tamil Nadu, India which is 29 km from Chennai. The shrine sees thousands of people everyday who visit to his tomb.

References

External links 
www.aulia-e-hind.com

People from Medina
Companions of the Prophet